Jonathan Mulder (born 2 January 2002) is a professional footballer who plays for Eerste Divisie club Telstar. Born in the Netherlands, he has represented Israel at youth level.

Early life
Mulder was born in the Netherlands to a Dutch father and Israeli mother. They moved to Israel shortly after Jonathan's birth. The family returned to the Netherlands when Jonathan was a teenager. Jonathan's older brother, Michael, is a footballer who plays for ADO Den Haag's U21 side. While on the pitch together, the brothers will sometimes converse in Hebrew.

Career statistics

Club

References

External links
 
 

2002 births
Living people
Dutch footballers
Israeli footballers
Jewish footballers
Association football defenders
ADO Den Haag players
SC Telstar players
Eredivisie players
Eerste Divisie players